The Miss Black America beauty contest is a competition for young African-American women. The pageant has garnered the support of artists, activists and performers including Stevie Wonder, Curtis Mayfield, and Oprah Winfrey. After 40 years, in 2009 the pageant had a "kick off" in Washington, D.C. to rebrand the competition. The first teen winner was Ashley Anglin. The first runner-up teen was Monet Jackson, a resident of Mitchellville, MD; and Destiny Welch, second runner-up and also an MD resident.  The adult winner was DC native and MD resident, Miss Kamilla Collier-Mullin. The first runner-up Miss Cherie A. Bryant, a northern Virginia resident; and the second runner up was Miss Janesia Simmons in the adult pageant.

History 
It was originally a local Philadelphia area contest to protest the lack of black women in the Miss America pageant. J. Morris Anderson created and produced the Miss Black America Pageant along with Brenda Cozart who organized and directed the pageant also serving as a beauty consultant for contestants and recruiter which started on August 17, 1968, at the Ritz-Carlton in Atlantic City. With support from Phillip H. Savage, Tri-State Director of the NAACP, the pageant received nationwide press coverage as a protest against the Miss America Pageant, an event that Mr. Savage and other NAACP leaders had long condemned for exclusion of black women contestants.

In September 1977, NBC televised the Miss Black America contest, the day before CBS televised Miss America.

The winners

In popular culture 

 A short documentary on the Miss Black America pageant was produced by director Bayer Mack and released by Block Starz Music Television as part of its Profiles of African-American Success video series.
 In 1970, Curtis Mayfield released a track entitled "Miss Black America" on his debut album, Curtis.
In 2021, Jennifer Holness released her documentary film, Subjects of Desire (2021) which documented "the cultural shift in North American beauty standards towards embracing Black female aesthetics" and predominantly featured prep for the 2018 pageant, and interviews with its contestants. The film premiered at SXSW and was screened in the Documentary Feature Competition.

References

External links 
 

African-American culture
Recurring events established in 1968
Beauty pageants in the United States
1968 establishments in New Jersey
American awards
Beauty pageants for people of specific ethnic or national descents